Nick Zeck, (b. January 27, 1983) in West Allis, Wisconsin, is a retired professional American football player. He attended Lakeland College where he played football and also basketball.

Early years
Zeck attended Nathan Hale High School where he participated in football, basketball and track. His Senior year, he was named First Team All-Greater Metro Conference in both football and basketball. Zeck was selected First Team All-Illini-Badger Conference in football and First Team All-Lake Michigan Conference in basketball as a sophomore, junior and senior; he was named First Team All-Lake Michigan Conference in basketball as a sophomore, junior and senior as well.

Pro career
Zeck was a member of the Louisville Fire for the final 4 games of the 2007 season. That same year he played for the Rock River Raptors of the United Indoor Football League. In 2008 Zeck had a tryout with the Georgia Force and was signed in May.  However, he was later cut by the team but then became a member of the Chicago Rush. In 2010, he played for the Milwaukee Iron. In the 2011 season he was a member of the Pittsburgh Power.

External links
Pittsburgh Power 2011 team

References

1983 births
Living people
People from West Allis, Wisconsin
Louisville Fire players
Rock River Raptors players
Georgia Force players
Chicago Rush players
Lakeland Muskies football players
Lakeland Muskies men's basketball players
Milwaukee Iron players
Pittsburgh Power players
Players of American football from Wisconsin
Basketball players from Wisconsin
Sportspeople from the Milwaukee metropolitan area
American men's basketball players